Communauté d'agglomération Grand Belfort is an intercommunal structure, centred on the city of Belfort. It is located in the Territoire de Belfort department, in the Bourgogne-Franche-Comté region, eastern France. It was created in January 2017. Its seat is in Belfort. Its area is 262.0 km2. Its population was 103,741 in 2017, of which 47,656 in Belfort proper.

Composition
The communauté d'agglomération consists of the following 52 communes:

Andelnans
Angeot
Argiésans
Autrechêne
Banvillars
Bavilliers
Belfort
Bermont
Bessoncourt
Bethonvilliers
Botans
Bourogne
Buc
Charmois
Châtenois-les-Forges
Chèvremont
Cravanche
Cunelières
Danjoutin
Denney
Dorans
Eguenigue
Éloie
Essert
Évette-Salbert
Fontaine
Fontenelle
Foussemagne
Frais
Lacollonge
Lagrange
Larivière
Menoncourt
Meroux-Moval
Méziré
Montreux-Château
Morvillars
Novillard
Offemont
Pérouse
Petit-Croix
Phaffans
Reppe
Roppe
Sermamagny
Sevenans
Trévenans
Urcerey
Valdoie
Vauthiermont
Vétrigne
Vézelois

References

Belfort
Belfort